The Azzopardi phenomenon,  or Azzopardi effect, is the presence of DNA in necrotic venules. It can occur in small cell carcinomas and in some high-grade malignant neoplasms. The effect is well known  in diagnostic surgical pathology. The phenomenon is named after the pathologist, John G. Azzopardi. 

Azzopardi was able to correctly characterize the effect as due to DNA; it had been thought previously but incorrectly to be calcium. Necrosis results in the release of cellular DNA, which adheres in patches to the walls of blood vessels, showing as intensely basophilic material on hematoxylin-eosin stain. 

The Azzopardi phenomenon is distinguished from the similar basophilic hematoxylin body.

References

External links
 Warnock ML, McCowin MJ in Practical Pathology of Chest Disease--Case Studies 
 Azzopardi phenomenon in a metastatic small cell carcinoma of the lung

Cancer
Anatomical pathology